Marcel Ichac (22 October 1906 - 9 April 1994) was a French alpinist, explorer, photographer and film director. Born in Rueil, France, Ichac was one of the first people to introduce electronic music in cinema with Ondes Martenot  for Karakoram (1936) and released the first French movie in CinemaScope, Nouveaux Horizons (1953). He also accompanied the French Alpine Club's 1950 expedition that climbed Annapurna, which was led by Maurice Herzog, and include such climbing luminaries as Lionel Terray, Louis Lachenal and Gaston Rébuffat. See Annapurna by Maurice Herzog, pub. E P Dutton & Co.|date=1952

Filmography 
Ichac directed movies of French explorations during the years 1930–1950. Expeditions he directed include:
 Karakoram, the first French expedition in Himalaya, Karakoram (1936)
 The first documentary film in the world about the Pilgrimage to Mecca (1940).
 A l'Assaut des Aiguilles du Diable (1942).
 Expeditions of Jacques-Yves Cousteau to the Mediterranean Sea (1948), the Red Sea (1955 : preparatory to the realization of The Silent World), and Lake Titicaca (1968).
 French Polar Expedition in Greenland with Paul-Emile Victor (1949).
 Victoire sur l'Annapurna, film on the 1950 French Annapurna expedition, with the first 8000m summit being reached by Maurice Herzog and Louis Lachenal).
 Les Etoiles de Midi (1959). Entered into the 9th Berlin International Film Festival.
 Le Conquérent de l'inutile (1967), a film he made about the life of his friend and mountain climber Lionel Terray.

Additionally, Ichac captured images of mountain warfare in World War II and the liberation of Torino, Italy in Tempête sur les Alpes (1944-1945).

Bibliography 
A l'assaut des Aiguilles du Diable (1945)
Regards vers l'Annapurna (1951)
Quand brillent les Etoiles de Midi (1960)

Awards 
 Silver Lion in the Venice film festival for Karakoram.
 Directed winner of the Prix du documentaire at Cannes Film Festival in 1952.
 Produced An Occurrence at Owl Creek Bridge which won Academy Award for Live Action Short Film.

References

External links 
 Marcel Ichac filmography
 Movies of Marcel Ichac
 Review of the movie and book Les Etoiles de Midi
 Images of Groenland in 1949 by Marcel Ichac
 Marcel Ichac receiving the Prix du Documentaire at the 1952 Cannes Film Festival
 

French documentary film directors
French mountain climbers
French explorers
French photographers
Mountaineering film directors
1906 births
1994 deaths
École nationale supérieure des arts décoratifs alumni